Juliet Wyers is an American singer-songwriter from Portland, Oregon.  She has recorded two albums, Clear (2003) and sunlit (summer:live) (2005).  Clear ranked 22nd in CD Baby's 2003 Top 100 Sellers contest, out of 35,000 artists.
Clear was also No. 27 Most Played Album on the FolkDJ
charts, and the first track, "Life, Love Me," was No. 24 Most Played Song (November 2003). In 2003 she was a finalist in six national songwriting competitions, including the New Folk competition at the Kerrville Folk Festival and the Emerging Artist Showcase at the Falcon Ridge Folk Festival.

Personal 
Juliet Wyers has also been a music teacher in the past. She has directed choirs as a middle school teacher in the Eugene/Springfield area before recording her two albums. Her father, Jan Wyers, once ran for Attorney General for the state of Oregon.

Discography
 Clear (2003)
 sunlit (summer:live) (2005)

External links
 Website on CD Baby

American folk musicians
American women singer-songwriters
Living people
Musicians from Portland, Oregon
Singer-songwriters from Oregon
Year of birth missing (living people)
21st-century American women